Dani Marvelous Namangge (born March 8, 1989) is an Indonesian former footballer played as a forward.

Club career

Sulut United
He was signed for Sulut United to play in the Liga 2 in the 2020 season.

Honours

Club
Persibat Batang
 Liga Indonesia First Division runner-up: 2014

References

External links 
Dani Namangge at Soccerway
Dani Namangge at Liga Indonesia

1989 births
Living people
People from Bitung
Indonesian footballers
Liga 2 (Indonesia) players
Association football forwards
Sportspeople from North Sulawesi
21st-century Indonesian people